Keki Adhikari (born December 17, 1989) is a Nepalese film actress and a professional model. She has appeared in numerous music videos, television commercials, print ads and Nepali movies. She started off her career featuring in music videos before she made her acting debut with Swor opposite Raj Ballav Koirala. She subsequently earned wide recognition for her performances in I Am Sorry, Masan, Mayako Barima, Mahasus, Biteka Pal and Mero Best Friend. She recently made her debut in theater with historical play Chaarumati, written by writer and a researcher Satyamohan Joshi.

Personal life 
Adhikari married her boyfriend Rohit Tiwari on April 21, 2022.

Education 
Keki Adhikari has graduated with an MBA degree in human resources management from Presidential Business School in Thapagau, Baneshwor, Kathmandu, in 2016. She had done her bachelor's degree in business in 2013 from Tribhuvan University. Keki did her schooling from Bal Sirjanalaya School in Kathmandu. She did her plus-two from Whitehouse College. She did her Bachelor in Information Management (BIM) from Prime College.

Filmography

Awards

References

Living people
21st-century Nepalese actresses
Nepalese female models
1989 births
Nepalese film actresses
Actors from Kathmandu